The Herman J. and Ella B. Voigts House is a historic house in Leawood, Kansas, U.S.. It was built in 1923 for Herman J. Voigts, the president of the First National Bank of
Olathe, and his wife Ella Busch. It was designed in the Prairie School architectural style. The couple died in 1970 and 1956 respectively, and their daughter Anna Lois Dubach lived in the inherited house until her death in 1992. It was purchased by Barry Grissom in 1993. It has been listed on the National Register of Historic Places since May 18, 1995.

References

Houses on the National Register of Historic Places in Kansas
Prairie School architecture in Kansas
Houses completed in 1923
Houses in Johnson County, Kansas
1923 establishments in Kansas